RelationShipped is an American reality series that premiered on November 9, 2017, on Facebook Watch. The interactive series, produced by BuzzFeed, allows viewers to influence decisions and events in each episode. Facebook users select the show's protagonist, the "Suitor", from eligible single men in the first episode. He hosts female competitors in a Los Angeles–based mansion, where they each vie for his affection. In subsequent episodes, the audience has the ability to nominate new prospective competitors to be introduced, and the opportunity to select date ideas, amongst other decisions. New episodes are released twice weekly, on Monday and Thursday.

Production
Episodes of the series air only days after they are filmed. This provides the show's Producers, with the ability to shape the narrative of the show as the audience would like to see it. BuzzFeed Motion Pictures', head of development Matthew Henick, has described the show saying, "We wanted to build a format that television audiences are familiar with, a dating format, but from the ground up for digital. Shooting and releasing it in real time allows the audience to affect the show and get involved in ways they couldn't before."

Episodes

Season 1 (2017–18)

Season 2 (2018)

Call-out order

 The contestant was introduced in this episode
 The contestant was eliminated
 The contestant quit
 The contestant won the competition

Reception
The series has received a mixed to negative reception since its premiere. The Guardians Jake Nevins criticized the show when saying, "It’ll all appear a bit ham-fisted to fans of The Bachelor and its chintzy elegance; worse, for those who buy into prevailing millennial stereotypes, it’ll be nothing short of unwatchable, a confirmation that we’re as self-involved and phone-obsessed as the world believes us to be."

See also
 List of original programs distributed by Facebook Watch

References

External links
RelationShipped on Facebook

Facebook Watch original programming
2010s American reality television series
2017 American television series debuts
English-language television shows